The Unio'n vun de Fräiheetsorganisatiounen or just Unio'n (Union of Freedom Organisations) was an organisation of members of the Luxembourgish Resistance which was founded in World War II. It emerged in March 1944 from the merger of the Luxembourgish Patriot League, the Luxembourgish People's Legion, the Luxembourgish Red Lion and other resistance movements, shortly before the end of the war in Luxembourg. In September 1944 the Luxembourgish Freedom Union also joined. It was the head of the Luxembourgish People's Legion, Lucien Dury, who contacted the other resistance movements in 1943 with a view to a merger. The resistance movements at the time had been weakened by raids and arrests by the Gestapo, and the goal was also to create a movement which could act as a representative body after the liberation. It was also planned that the organisation should, in creating a militia, contribute to maintaining order after the liberation. 

The Unio'n continued its existence after the war as an association, with the goal of keeping the memory of the active resistance in the years 1940-1945 alive. In 2011 it had about 150 members. In March 2011 the organisation had a memorial plaque put up outside the house in Bonnevoie where the Unio'n was founded.

Further reading
 Hoffmann, Serge: Le mouvement de résistance LVL au Luxembourg, Archives nationales, 2004, 158 pages.

Luxembourg Resistance
Military units and formations established in 1944
1944 establishments in Luxembourg